The 2012 Nebraska Cornhuskers football team represented the University of Nebraska in the 2012 NCAA Division I FBS football season. The team was coached by Bo Pelini and played their home games at Memorial Stadium in Lincoln, Nebraska. The Cornhuskers finished with 10–4 overall, 7–1 Legends, to become Big Ten Legends Division champions. In the postseason, the team was invited to the 2012 Big Ten Football Championship Game. It was their fourth division title in the last five years but the first since joining the Big Ten. They lost to Wisconsin (placed in the game due to sanctions on two other schools) and they lost to Georgia in the 2013 Capital One Bowl weeks later.

The Cornhuskers became known for their comebacks this year, as they came back after trailing by double digits during four conference games. These wins included a 30–27 victory over Wisconsin (Nebraska down 27–10 early in 3rd quarter), Northwestern (down 28–16 with 5 minutes to go), Michigan State (down 24–14 early in 4th quarter), and Penn State (down 20–6 at halftime).

No spring scrimmage game was played prior to the season, as it was canceled due to weather concerns and player conflicts. It was the first year that Nebraska did not hold a spring scrimmage since they started playing them in 1950.

Schedule

Roster and coaching staff

Depth chart

Game summaries

Southern Miss

Source:

The Huskers started the 2012 football season off with a home win against Southern Miss.  The Huskers are now 3–1 against the Golden Eagles with the only loss being from the last time these teams faced each other in 2004.  This game started a three game home-away-home series with additional meetings in 2013 and 2015. The 2013 meeting was scheduled to be played at Southern Miss, but the game was moved to Lincoln as an attempt to earn more money. Southern Miss also thought about scheduling the game in New Orleans or Kansas City before deciding to give Nebraska an eighth home game in 2013.

UCLA

Source:

The Huskers went on the road for the first time in their second game of the season to face UCLA in Pasadena, California. The two teams have faced each other previously ten times, with the Huskers having six wins to UCLA’s four coming into the game. The last time these teams faced each other was in Lincoln in 1994 where the Huskers defeated UCLA 49–21.  This game started a home and home series that will be concluded during the 2013 season. With this win UCLA is 4–2 at home against the Cornhuskers.

Arkansas State

Source:

The third game of the season brought the Huskers home to Lincoln to face Arkansas State, led by head coach Gus Malzahn, for the second time in history. The Huskers defeated the Red Wolves in 2009 with a score of 38–9. During the first half of the game Pelini began feeling ill. At halftime he was sent to a local hospital for a series of precautionary tests that ultimately revealed no major health concerns. Defensive coordinator John Papuchis took over head coaching duties in the second half in Pelini's absence.

Idaho State

Source:

The fourth and final game before conference play paired the Huskers against Idaho St. for their first meeting in history. The Bengals are from the Big Sky Conference.

Wisconsin

Source:

Nebraska began its second season of Big Ten conference play with a home game against Wisconsin, the team that defeated them 48–17 in their first Big Ten conference game in 2011. The all-time series coming into the game was tied 3–3 with Nebraska having last hosted Wisconsin in 1973. This game also was marked as "The Quick and The Red" as both schools went against tradition and wore alternate uniforms created by Adidas. Nebraska wore a black helmet, normally white, an all red uniform with black stripes on both shoulders and down the side of the leg, and a black "N" on the front instead of the number. Wisconsin wore a red helmet, normally white, with a traditional "W" on it, all white uniform, shoulders covered in red, red stripes down side of legs with a red "W" where the numbers normally are.

Ohio State

Source:

The Huskers traveled to Columbus to face Ohio State, who were playing their first season under new head coach Urban Meyer. In 2011, Nebraska defeated the Buckeyes, 34–27, on the strength of a historic second-half comeback after being down 27–6. This game marked the Huskers' first visit to Columbus since 1956. There would be no comeback in this one, as the Buckeyes, after trailing 14-7 after the first quarter, pulled away by halftime to win 63-38.

Northwestern

Source:

Nebraska came into the game leading the all time series 3 wins to 2 losses. This game was the Huskers first game in Evanston since 1931.

Michigan

Source:

Michigan came into the game leading the all time series at 4–2–1. This was the Wolverine's first trip to Lincoln since a 6–6 tie in 1911.

Michigan State

Source:

Nebraska came into the game having never lost to the Spartans, leading the all time series 6–0. This was the Huskers first visit to East Lansing since spoiling Nick Saban's first game, a 50–10 Nebraska win in 1995.

Penn State

Source:

This was Penn State's first trip to Lincoln since 2003 where the all time series between the two coming into the game was 7–6, with Nebraska having the advantage.

Minnesota

Source:

The Golden Gophers lead the all time series 29–21–2, but have not won a game in Lincoln since 1960. The last Minnesota team to play at Nebraska was the victim of a 56–0 loss in 1990. The win ensured Nebraska's first unbeaten home season since 2001.

Iowa

Source:

Nebraska leads the all-time series 27–12–3. The last Husker team to visit Iowa City opened the 1999 season with a 42–7 victory.

Wisconsin (Big Ten Championship Game)

Source:

This game marked Nebraska's only appearance in the Big Ten Championship game.  Nebraska's last appearance in a conference championship game was in 2010 their last season in the Big XII conference.  Nebraska defeated Wisconsin 30–27 in the regular season. Wisconsin won the game and received the conference berth in the 2013 Rose Bowl.

Capital One Bowl

Source:

Rankings

References

Nebraska
Nebraska Cornhuskers football seasons
Nebraska Cornhuskers football